The Battle of Beth Horon was a military engagement fought in 66 CE between the Roman army and Jewish rebels in the early phase of the First Jewish–Roman War. During the event, the Syrian Legion Legio XII Fulminata with auxiliary support headed by Legate of Syria Cestius Gallus was ambushed by a large force of Judean rebel infantry at the passage of Beth Horon, on their retreat from Jerusalem towards the coastal plane. The rebel Judean forces headed by Simon Bar Giora, Eleazar ben Simon and other rebel generals succeeded in inflicting a humiliating defeat, killing some 6,000 Roman troops and capturing Legion's aquila, with much of the Roman Army fleeing in disarray from the battle field. The defeat of the Roman Army had major implications in prolonging the rebellion, leading to the short-lived Judean self-governorship in Judea and Galilee.

Background

Roman influence in Judea 
Judea came under Roman influence in 63 BCE, when Roman general Pompey arrived in the Levant as part of the Roman campaign against Mithridates VI of Pontus. In 37 BC Rome installed Herod the Great as a client king of Judea, helping him oust the Parthian-backed leader Antigonus II Mattathias. Shortly after Herod's death, Judea was partitioned among his sons as tetrarchy, but due to disturbances by 6 CE it came under direct Roman control and, with the exception of a small autonomous region in the north, became a Roman province, ruled by prefects appointed by Rome.

Rebellion within Judaea province 
In 66 CE, long-standing Greek and Jewish religious tensions worsened after Jewish worshippers witnessed Greek civilians sacrificing birds in front of a local synagogue in Caesarea Maritima and complained to the authorities. The Roman garrison did not intervene, leading to the triggering of popular protests against Roman taxation. The protests were ignored by the governor until public attacks in Jerusalem on Roman citizens and others accused of having Roman sympathies, led the army garrison to intervene. The soldiers were attacked as they moved through the city by an increasing proportion of the Jewish residents; many troops were killed and the rest evacuated Jerusalem. As news of this action spread, many other towns and Jews joined the rebellion. Fearing the worst, the pro-Roman king Agrippa II and his sister Berenice fled Jerusalem to the Galilee.

Intervention of the Syrian Legion 
With an aim of crushing the rebels and restoring order, Cestius Gallus, the legate of Syria, marched on Jerusalem with Legio XII Fulminata, 2000 legionaries selected from each of the other legions nearby, six cohorts of auxiliary infantry and four squadrons of cavalry. Such had been the standard Roman reaction to uprisings at the time. All available troops were mustered, formed into a column and sent to confront its perceived centre. Including troops furnished by allies, some 36,000 troops were assembled. Ideally, such a show of force would have allowed the Romans to regain the initiative and prevent the rebellion from developing and growing stronger. Gallus conquered Bezetha, in the Jezreel Valley, soon to be the seat of the Great Sanhedrin (Jewish supreme religious court), but was unable to take the Temple Mount; he now decided to withdraw and wait for reinforcements.

The battle 

Withdrawing towards the coast from Jerusalem, the Romans were closely pursued by rebel scouts. As they neared the pass of Beth Horon, they were ambushed and came under attack from massed missile fire and arrows. They were then suddenly rushed by a large force of rebel Judean infantry. The Romans could not get into formation within the narrow confines of the pass and lost cohesion under the fierce assault. The equivalent of an entire legion was destroyed, with 6,000 troops killed, many wounded, and the rest fleeing in disarray. Gallus succeeded in escaping with a fraction of his troops to Antioch by sacrificing the greater part of his army and a large amount of materiel.

Aftermath 
After the battle, the Jewish rebels went through the Roman dead stripping them of their armor, helmets, equipment, and weapons. Soon after his return, Gallus died (before the spring of 67 CE), and was succeeded in the governorship by Mucianus.

This major Roman defeat encouraged many more volunteers and towns in Judea to throw their lot in with the rebellion. The Judean victory led to the establishment of the Judean self-governorship in Judea and Galilee, with some of the figure heads of the battle taking leading roles in the governance. Battle leaders Eleazar ben Simon, Joshua ben Zafia and Niger the Perean were appointed regional governors across Judaea's territories. However, Simon bar Giora was evicted from Jerusalem due to fears by rebel government leaders of his dominance. This led Bar Giora to raise his own army in southern Judaea.

A full-scale war was then inevitable. The shock of the defeat convinced the Romans of the need to fully commit to crushing the rebellion regardless of the effort it would require. Emperor Nero and the senate then appointed Vespasian, the future Emperor, to bring the Roman army to Judea and crush the rebellion with a force of four Legions.

Literature 
In M.C. Scott's historical novel, Rome: The Eagle of the Twelfth, the author describes the Battle of Beth Horon and the destruction of the XII legion.

References

Bibliography

External link

66
60s in the Roman Empire
Jews and Judaism in the Roman Empire
Beth Horon
History of the Middle East
First Jewish–Roman War
1st-century battles
60s conflicts